Jon Daly, sometimes credited as Jonathan C. Daly, Jon C. Daly or Jonathan Barney Daly, is an American actor, comedian, writer, and producer best known for his sketch comedy work on the Comedy Central series Kroll Show. In 2013 he starred as Hobbes in the Amazon Studios original series Betas, and also played Agent Filippo in Zoolander 2 (2016).

Early life and education
Daly was born and raised in Pittsburgh, Pennsylvania. He first became involved in improv performing in Pittsburgh when he was 16 at a show called "Friday Night Improvs" at the University of Pittsburgh and continued performing while attending the University of North Carolina School of the Arts.

Career
Daly has been a regular performer at the Upright Citizens Brigade Theatre (UCB) for over ten years where he performed in the improv group "Mother". He continues to perform at the theater's Los Angeles division. Some of his notable work at UCB was performing in the sketch groups such as Mother and Mr. A$$ and creating characters such as Sappity Tappity and Bill Cosby-Bukowski. Daly has appeared in films such as The Secret Life of Walter Mitty, Mystery Team, Bride Wars, Blackballed: The Bobby Dukes Story, and College Road Trip. He starred as Hobbes in the Amazon Studios comedy series Betas in 2013 and was also a recurring sketch performer and writer/producer on Comedy Central's Kroll Show.

Daly has had recurring roles on The Life & Times of Tim, Happy Endings, NTSF:SD:SUV::, Drunk History, Family Guy, and IFC's Comedy Bang! Bang!, as well as making guest appearances on comedy programs such as Parks and Recreation (appearing only in the first episode and last episode, six years apart), The Inbetweeners, Key & Peele, Bob's Burgers, Nick Swardson's Pretend Time, and Mr. Neighbor's House. He has also written for the MTV sketch series Human Giant and the Scott Aukerman & B. J. Porter created sketch pilot The Right Now! Show.

Daly and frequent writing partner and collaborator Brett Gelman also performed for many years as the comedy rap duo "Cracked Out". Their EP The Fleetwood Crack was made available for download on their website in 2007. Daly is also a frequent guest on Earwolf podcasts such as Comedy Bang! Bang! and improv4humans. In November 2012, he started his own podcast for the Earwolf network, Rafflecast, which ran for 30 episodes. In 2017 Daly began appearing as Arnie Brown in the Showtime comedy series I'm Dying Up Here.

Filmography

Film

Television

Web series

Music videos

References

External links

Living people
21st-century American comedians
21st-century American male writers
21st-century American screenwriters
American male comedians
American male television actors
American male television writers
American male voice actors
American podcasters
American sketch comedians
People from Pittsburgh
Screenwriters from Pennsylvania
Television producers from Pennsylvania
Upright Citizens Brigade Theater performers
Year of birth missing (living people)